Sky Fence is a public art work by artist Linda Howard located at the Lynden Sculpture Garden near Milwaukee, Wisconsin. The brushed aluminum sculpture has upright louvered elements; it is installed on the lawn. Howard erected the sculpture at Lynden in the fall of 1977. Of Sky Fence, Howard said, "The eye is forced up to the sky. It reaffirms the ground and transcends in the direction of the sky."

See also 
 Round About

References 

1976 sculptures
Outdoor sculptures in Milwaukee
Aluminum sculptures in Wisconsin
1976 establishments in Wisconsin